George William Card, F.G.S., A.R.S.M. (? – 2 June 1943) was an Australian petrographer.

Card was responsible for the collections of the Mining Museum in Sydney and was a friend of William Rowan Browne; he was awarded the Clarke Medal by the Royal Society of New South Wales in 1935.

Card published Handbook to the Mining and Geological Museum, Sydney in 1902.

References

Australian Academy of Science

External links
ebook of 'Handbook to the Mining and Geological Museum, Sydney'

Australian geologists
Year of birth missing
1943 deaths